Jeremy Yates (born 6 July 1982) is a former New Zealand professional racing cyclist, who last rode for the Manisaspor Continental Cycling Team.

In 2004 Yates was banned for two years by the Belgian cycling federation for having an unexplained high level of testosterone.

Career highlights

1999
 1st John Bull Cup
2000
  1st Junior Road race, Plouay
2002
 1st Stage 5 Tour of Southland, Crown Range 
 National Under–23 Road Championships
1st  Road race
2003
 1st GP Istria 4
 1st in North Harbour Cycling Club Criterium (b) (NZL)
 National Under–23 Road Championships
1st  Road race
3rd Time trial
 2nd Overall Le Transalsace International, U23 
 2nd Overall, Tour of Southland
1st Stage 1, 2 & 5
 3rd Overall, Tour de Vineyards
2004
 1st Lake Taupo Cycle Challenge 
 1st Stage 4 Tour de Vineyards, Richmond 
 1st Stage 4 Tour of Wellington, Masterton 
 1st Overall UAE International Emirates Post Tour
1st Stage 4
 Le Triptyque des Monts et Châteaux
1st Stage 1 & 3
 1st Overall Tweedaagse van de Gaverstreek
 1st Stage 4 Tour de Bretagne
 1st Stage 2 Tour du Tarn-et Garonne, Caussade
 1st Flèche Ardennaise 
 3rd Romsée – Stavelot – Romsée 
2007
 3rd Overall Tour of Taranaki 
1st Stage 3 & 5
 1st Coromandel K2 Classic 
 1st in grade, 2nd overall Lake Taupo Cycle challenge
 2nd Taupo-Napier Classic 
2008
 1st Overall Tour de Vineyards
2nd in Stage 2 & 3
 1st Le Race
 1st Coromandel K2 Classic 
 1st Rice Mountain Classic
 1st Wanganui GP
 2nd Stage 4 Benchmark Homes Tour, Kaikoura
 4th Overall Tour de Langkawi
 6th Overall Tour of Southland
1st Stages 2 & 6
 7th Overall Herald Sun Tour
2009
 1st Overall Tour de Vineyards
1st in Stage 2 & 3
 1st Coromandel K2 Classic
 1st Le Race
 1st Stage 6 Tour of Southland
 5th Overall Tour of Wellington
2010
 1st Coromandel K2 Classic
 1st Taupo-Napier Classic 
 1st Rice Mountain Classic
 3rd Overall Tour of Southland
1st Stage 2 & 6
 7th Overall Tour of Wellington
 10th Overall Tour do Brasil
1st Stage 5
2011
 National Road Championships
3rd Road race
 5th Overall Tour of Isparta
 7th Overall Tour of Victory
1st Stage 1
 7th Overall Tour of Marmara
 10th Overall International Tour of Hellas

See also
 List of doping cases in cycling

References

1982 births
Living people
Olympic cyclists of New Zealand
Cyclists at the 2004 Summer Olympics
Doping cases in cycling
New Zealand sportspeople in doping cases
Place of birth missing (living people)